Organizaţia Naţională a Femeilor Liberale (National Organisation of Liberal Women in Romanian) is the women's wing of the National Liberal Party of Romania (PNL). It represents the women of the PNL local, county and national organisations.

External links
Liberal Women Organisation - official site
Liberal organizations
National Liberal Party (Romania)
Women's wings of political parties
Women's organizations based in Romania